Eric Faulkner (born 21 October 1953 as Eric Falconer) is a guitarist, songwriter and singer, best known as a member of the Scottish pop band, the Bay City Rollers.

Faulkner was born at the Edinburgh Royal Infirmary, Edinburgh, Scotland. As a youngster he learned to play the viola and played for a time in a youth orchestra. He also plays the violin, mandolin, bass and keyboards. He attended Liberton High School in Edinburgh.

Faulkner joined the Bay City Rollers in 1972 as their guitarist, after a period with the group KIP (previously known as Sugar). Faulkner was a member of the Rollers for the remainder of their existence into the 1980s. He co-wrote more than half of the recorded catalogue of Rollers songs including the UK Singles Chart hits "Money Honey" and "Love Me Like I Love You". 
 
In 1976, during the Rollers heyday, Faulkner made headlines for an alleged parasuicide attempt via sleeping pill overdose. The incident was turned into a media opportunity by Bay City Rollers manager, Tam Paton who allegedly phoned the press before emergency services; Faulkner maintains the overdose was accidental and not a suicide attempt.

In the 1990s, he worked as lead singer of a reformed version of the Bay City Rollers, which also featured Alan Longmuir, Stuart Wood and singer Karen "Kass" Prosser. He also toured with his own band, The Eric Faulkner Co-operative that he founded with Kass.

Faulkner performed at Guilfest 2006 with 3 Men & Black, featuring Pauline Black from The Selecter. During the set, he led a tribute to the late Syd Barrett and sang "See Emily Play", as well as "Radio Heaven", a recent song he penned, and a rendition of the Bay City Rollers hit "Shang-a-Lang". Faulkner continued to perform with 3 Men & Black as a support act on their 2006 concert tour.

In 2007, Faulkner continued as a solo artist and appeared at the Glastonbury Festival as a protest singer in support of British politician Tony Benn. It was arranged for him to end his performance by introducing Tony Benn on the Left Field stage under the banner "Another World is Possible".

Faulkner and the five other former Bay City Rollers members filed a lawsuit in 2007 against Arista Records, which alleged a breach of contract for unpaid royalties.

For many years, he also performed all the old favourite Roller tunes as Eric Faulkner's Bay City Rollers at festivals such as Rebellion and Mathew Street.

Festival performances for his solo acoustic set have included The Acoustic Festival of Britain, Fèis Ìle (Islay Festival of Music and Malt), Parkfest and The Edinburgh Guitar and Music Festival.

In February 2015, Faulkner almost died when he contracted viral encephalitis. Although initial recovery seemed rapid, he was left with post encephalitic syndrome. During his recovery in 2017 he wrote and recorded new music.

In July 2018, Faulkner returned to the stage, with performances at the Heart of Hawick Music Festival in August.

References

Bibliography
Irwin Stambler, Encyclopedia of Pop, Rock & Soul. 1974. St. Martin's Press, Inc. New York, N.Y.

External links
 

1953 births
Living people
Musicians from Edinburgh
Scottish pop guitarists
Scottish male guitarists
Scottish songwriters
Scottish multi-instrumentalists
Bay City Rollers members